Lobbes is a municipality of Wallonia located in the province of Hainaut, Belgium. 

On 1 January 2006 Lobbes had a total population of 5,499. The total area is 32.08 km² which gives a population density of 171 inhabitants per km².

The municipality consists of the following districts: Bienne-lez-Happart, Lobbes, Mont-Sainte-Geneviève, and Sars-la-Buissière.

The town grew up round Lobbes Abbey, a religious house established here in about 650.

The tramway of the ASVi runs through Lobbes.

Births
 Jonas van Genechten, professional road bicycle racer
 Alfred Wotquenne, musical bibliographer
 Romain Zingle, professional cyclist

References

External links
 

 
Municipalities of Hainaut (province)